Tapleytown is a rural community in the southeastern portion of Hamilton, Ontario.

Neighbourhoods in Hamilton, Ontario